Maach Mishti & More (English: Fish, sweet and more) is a 2013 Indian Bengali language drama film directed by Mainak Bhaumik. This is a comedy film about today's Bengali generation. Rituparno Ghosh wrote lyrics of the songs of this film.

Plot 
The film looks at a Bengali joint family of Kolkata in the present time. The grandfather (Soumitra Chatterjee) is modern, mingles freely with youngsters and wears hip clothes. The parents (Anuradha Roy and Pradip Mukherjee) are comparatively conventional but generally do not interfere in their kids' lives. The oldest, Rahul (Souvik Kundagrami), a successful NRI, returns to base with his wife (Swastika Mukherjee) with plans of opening a restaurant of American food. The second son, Ronnie (Parambrato), is a corporate honcho going steady with a rich Marwari girl called Swati (Rachita Chauhan) but is not sure about whether he really is in love with her or whether the slightly crazy Ishaani (Raima Sen) fascinates him more. The youngest, Raj (Anubrata), is a wannabe filmmaker with a mind of his own and his pockets filled with money doled out by the elders. During the story, Rahul falls in love with June, a girl who helps him in setting up a restaurant. They almost make out but Rahul desists and leaves the place, ruining everything. An angry and frustrated Reena meanwhile leaves the home because Rahul has been ignition her for long. Later, Rahul goes to Reena's home and asks for forgiveness, and they reconcile.  The film closes with Rahul and his wife going back to the US to open a Bengali restaurant called Maach Misti & More.
Again, Ronnie is confused by Swati and her father. Marwari Bengali cultural differences play a huge role in ruining their relationship. Swati's father is a money and commodity oriented person who dominates over Ronnie and their relationship while Swati does not give any importance to Ronnie's opinions. Around this time, a little wacky but free spirited Ishani, a college friend, comes in Ronnie's life. Their story ends as Ronnie politely makes Swati realise they are not made for each other and stuff won't work out between them. Instead of marrying Swati, he goes on a vacation to Goa with Ishani.

Cast 
 Soumitra Chatterjee 
 Swastika Mukherjee as Reena
 Anubrata Basu as Raj
 Parno Mittra as Sunny / Sunaina
 Raima Sen as Ishaani
 Parambrata Chattopadhyay as Ronnie
 Pradip Mukherjee
 Mithu Chakraborty
 Souvik Kundagrami as Rahul
 Neha Panda as Piya
 Anuradha Roy
 Rachita Chauhan Bhattacharya as Swati
 Pamela Singh Bhutoria as June

Soundtrack 

Music of the film is composed by National Award winning music director Neel Dutt and the lyrics are penned by Srijit Mukherji, Souvik Misra and Rituparno Ghosh. The guitarist is Amyt Datta.

The music of the film received favourable reviews from critics and audience because of its freshness and feel-good rhythm. They have a romantic flavour with a breath of independence to them. All the songs – Tumi Ebar, Daak Peon, Dekha Habe, Majhe Majhe and Ami Jodi Bhir Hoye Jai appealed to the mass, especially the youth. The song Tumi Ebar was singled out for maximum praise because of its rendition by Somlata Acharyya Chowdhury, lyrics by Srijit Mukherji and music by Neel Dutt. The music of Maach Mishti and More received numerous nominations at prestigious award ceremonies.

Awards and nominations

Filmfare Awards East::
Best Actor Supporting Role Female – Bengali – Swastika Mukherjee (Nominated)
Best Actor Supporting Role Female – Bengali – Raima Sen (Nominated)
Best Music Director – Bengali – Neel Dutt (Nominated)
Best Lyricist – Bengali – Srijit Mukherji for Tumi Ebar (Nominated)
Best Singer Female – Bengali – Somlata Acharyya Chowdhury for Tumi Ebar (Nominated)

Zee Bangla Gaurav Samman::
Best Director – Mainak Bhaumik (Nominated)
Best Lyrics – Srijit Mukherji for Tumi Ebar (Nominated)
Best Playback Singer – Female (Film) – Somlata Acharyya Chowdhury for Tumi Ebar (Nominated)

See also 
 Dutta Vs Dutta, a 2012 Bengali-language film

References

External links 
 

Bengali-language Indian films
2010s Bengali-language films
Films directed by Mainak Bhaumik
Indian drama films